Prostanthera arapilensis is a flowering plant in the family Lamiaceae and is endemic to a small area of Victoria, Australia. It is an erect shrub with hairy branches, broadly egg-shaped to more or less round leaves and pale mauve or white flowers with orange-brown spots or streaks inside the petal tube.

Description
The leaves are hairy with oil glands on the lower surface.

Taxonomy
Prostanthera arapilensis was first formally described in 2006 by Mark Williams, Andrew Drinnan and N.G.Walsh in the journal Australian Systematic Botany from specimens collected on Mount Arapiles.

Distribution and habitat
This mintbush grows in heathy woodland and scrubland and is only known from the rocky summit of Mount Arapiles.

References

arapilensis
Flora of Victoria (Australia)
Lamiales of Australia
Plants described in 2006
Taxa named by Neville Grant Walsh